Med vidöppna fönster (With wide open windows) is the 18th studio album by Swedish singer/songwriter Tomas Ledin, released in March 2004.

Track listing
Adapted from Spotify and Tidal.

References

2004 albums
Tomas Ledin albums